The Symphony No. 8 in D major, (K. 48), by Wolfgang Amadeus Mozart is dated December 13, 1768. It was written in Vienna, at a time when the family were already due to have returned home to Salzburg. In a letter to his friend in Salzburg, Lorenz Hagenauer, Leopold Mozart says of the delay that "we could not bring our affairs to a conclusion earlier, even though I endeavored strenuously to do so." The autograph of the Symphony No. 8 is today preserved in the Staatsbibliothek Preusischer Kulturbesitz in Berlin.

Structure 
The symphony is in four movements, and is scored for two oboes, two horns, two trumpets, timpani and strings. The inclusion of trumpets and timpani is unusual for Mozart's early symphonies. It has been described as a "ceremonial work".

There are four movements:

Allegro, 
Andante, 
Menuetto and Trio, 
Molto allegro, 

The first movement begins with downward leaps on the violins and follows with scale figures. These sets of figures alternate between strings and winds.

The second movement is for strings alone and begins with a narrow melodic range which expands toward the end.

The third movement is a Minuet full of rapid string passages, and includes the trumpets and timpani, but not during the Trio.

The final movement is a gigue, whose main theme unusually does not end the movement.

References

Sources
Kenyon, Nicholas: The Pocket Guide to Mozart Pegasus Books, New York 2006 
Zaslaw, Neal: Mozart's Symphonies: Context, Performance Practice, Reception OUP, Oxford 1991

External links 

08
1768 compositions
Compositions in D major